Pterynopsis is an extinct genus of sea snails, marine gastropod mollusks in the subfamily Ocenebrinae of the family Muricidae, the murex snails or rock snails.

Species
 † Pterynopsis meridionalis Lozouet, 1999 
 † Pterynopsis prosopeion E.H. Vokes, 1972 
 † Pterynopsis subcontabulata (Millet, 1854)

References

  Lozouet, P., 1999. - Nouvelles espèces de gastéropodes (Mollusca: Gastropoda) de l'Oligocène et du Miocène inférieur d'Aquitaine (sud-ouest de la France). Partie 2. Cossmanniana 6(1-2): 1-68

Ocenebrinae